Peter Mitchell (born 14 June, 1960) is an Australian television presenter.

He has been the chief news presenter for HSV-7 of their flagship bulletin "Seven News Melbourne" since the year 2000, and prior to that,  he was the weekend news presenter.

Career
Mitchell began at the Nine Network in 1977 as a sport reporter.  In this position he covered sports such as Australian rules football, golf, tennis and the Commonwealth Games. In 1982, Peter became a general news reporter and in this position he covered many stories including Victoria's horrific Ash Wednesday bushfires in 1983.

In 1987, Mitchell joined the Seven Network and became weekend news presenter. He held this position for 13 years until November 2000 when he replaced David Johnston and Anne Fulwood as the solo weeknight presenter.

In 1997, Peter was the first news presenter in Australia to break the news, during an AFL match, that Princess Diana had died.

His journalism experience has also included writing a weekly column for the Sunday Herald Sun for two years called "Tee for Two" and publishing a book – the biography of Australian golfing legend Peter Thomson, a five-time winner of the prestigious British Open.

In a Seven News bulletin that went to air in March 2018, Mitchell used some inappropriate wording to describe a murder trial which was ongoing; he subsequently apologised to the Victorian Supreme Court for his actions.

Award
In 2010, Peter was inducted into the City of Frankston Hall of Fame as a tribute to his strong link to the city and the significant impact of his work.

Personal life
Mitchell grew up on the Mornington Peninsula, attending The Peninsula School, in Mount Eliza. His father, Geoff Mitchell, was a councillor on the Frankston City Council in the 1960s and 1970s, served a term as the Mayor of Frankston (1970/1971) and also played football for Frankston in the VFA.

Mitchell is a passionate Collingwood Football Club (AFL) fan and began going to watch them play, with his father when he was 5 years old.

He is married to wife Philippa and they have five children together, Amelia, Ben, Lucy, Maisie and Harry and four grandchildren.

References

External links
Peter Mitchell's official site

Australian television journalists
Seven News presenters
1960 births
Living people
Television personalities from Melbourne
People from Mornington Peninsula
People from Frankston, Victoria